The Síndic d'Aran (Aran Syndic in Occitan) is the head of government of the Val d'Aran, an autonomously governed region within the Province of Lleida of Catalonia, Spain. The Síndic leads the thirteen-member Conselh Generau d'Aran, the governing body of the region. The office of Síndic d'Aran and the larger autonomous government were created in June 1991.

The Síndic d'Aran is elected by the members of the Conselh Generau d'Aran. To be elected as Síndic, a candidate must win either an absolute majority in the first vote or a simple majority in the second round. Successful candidates serve a four-year term in office.

List of Síndics d'Aran

Timeline

References

Síndics d'Aran
Aranese politicians
Politics of the Val d'Aran
Politics of Catalonia